Yang Chen (born 1 November 1991) is a Chinese football player who currently plays for China League One side Guangdong South China Tiger.

Club career
Yang Chen started his professional football career in 2011 when he was promoted to Shandong Luneng's first squad. On 16 June 2016, he made his debut for Shandong Luneng in the 2012 Chinese Super League against Liaoning Whowin, coming on as a substitute for Wang Gang in the 85th minute. He scored his first goal for the club on 27 June 2012 in a 4-0 win against Dongguan Nancheng in the 2012 Chinese FA Cup. He returned to Shandong Tengding in July 2013.  In 2015, Yang signed for Hainan Seamen.

In June 2016, Yang transferred to China League Two side Meixian Hakka.

Career statistics
Statistics accurate as of match played 3 November 2018.

References

External links
 

1991 births
Living people
Chinese footballers
Sportspeople from Nanjing
Footballers from Jiangsu
Shandong Taishan F.C. players
Guangdong South China Tiger F.C. players
China League One players
Chinese Super League players
Association football midfielders